Maurice Hudson (born 1930) is an English former professional footballer who played as a right back.

Career
Born in Barnsley, Hudson played for Barnsley, making 36 Football League appearances. He signed for Bradford City in July 1955, leaving the club in 1956 to sign for Swaithe Main Athletic. During his time with Bradford City he made four appearances in the Football League.

Sources

References

1930 births
Living people
English footballers
Barnsley F.C. players
Bradford City A.F.C. players
English Football League players
Association football fullbacks